Moscow City Duma District 38 is one of 45 constituencies in Moscow City Duma. The constituency covers eastern half of New Moscow, as well as parts of Prospekt Vernadskogo and Troparyovo-Nikulino. District 38 was created in 2013, after Moscow City Duma had been expanded from 35 to 45 seats.

Members elected

Election results

2014

|-
! colspan=2 style="background-color:#E9E9E9;text-align:left;vertical-align:top;" |Candidate
! style="background-color:#E9E9E9;text-align:left;vertical-align:top;" |Party
! style="background-color:#E9E9E9;text-align:right;" |Votes
! style="background-color:#E9E9E9;text-align:right;" |%
|-
|style="background-color:"|
|align=left|Mikhail Balakin
|align=left|Liberal Democratic Party
|
|46.01%
|-
|style="background-color:"|
|align=left|Igor Sagenbayev
|align=left|Communist Party
|
|21.15%
|-
|style="background-color:"|
|align=left|Denis Shiryayev
|align=left|A Just Russia
|
|11.84%
|-
|style="background-color:"|
|align=left|Ilya Khandrikov
|align=left|Yabloko
|
|6.93%
|-
|style="background-color:"|
|align=left|Boris Tokayev
|align=left|Independent
|
|4.94%
|-
|style="background-color:"|
|align=left|Aleksandr Sheludko
|align=left|Independent
|
|4.66%
|-
| colspan="5" style="background-color:#E9E9E9;"|
|- style="font-weight:bold"
| colspan="3" style="text-align:left;" | Total
| 
| 100%
|-
| colspan="5" style="background-color:#E9E9E9;"|
|- style="font-weight:bold"
| colspan="4" |Source:
|
|}

2019

|-
! colspan=2 style="background-color:#E9E9E9;text-align:left;vertical-align:top;" |Candidate
! style="background-color:#E9E9E9;text-align:left;vertical-align:top;" |Party
! style="background-color:#E9E9E9;text-align:right;" |Votes
! style="background-color:#E9E9E9;text-align:right;" |%
|-
|style="background-color:"|
|align=left|Aleksandr Kozlov
|align=left|Independent
|
|35.65%
|-
|style="background-color:"|
|align=left|Igor Glek
|align=left|A Just Russia
|
|24.99%
|-
|style="background-color:"|
|align=left|Lyudmila Yeremina
|align=left|Communist Party
|
|14.85%
|-
|style="background-color:"|
|align=left|Stanislav Smirnov
|align=left|Liberal Democratic Party
|
|10.56%
|-
|style="background-color:"|
|align=left|Natalia Andrusenko
|align=left|Communists of Russia
|
|8.39%
|-
| colspan="5" style="background-color:#E9E9E9;"|
|- style="font-weight:bold"
| colspan="3" style="text-align:left;" | Total
| 
| 100%
|-
| colspan="5" style="background-color:#E9E9E9;"|
|- style="font-weight:bold"
| colspan="4" |Source:
|
|}

References

Moscow City Duma districts